"Original of the Species" is a song by rock band U2 and the tenth track from their 2004 album, How to Dismantle an Atomic Bomb.

Promotion
A live video clip of this song from the DVD Vertigo 2005: Live From Chicago is featured in a television commercial promoting the video capable Apple iPod.  During that performance, Bono dedicates it to his two daughters.  The image of Bono singing this song from the live recording in Chicago was used as the icon Apple used for the artist tab in the music app on their devices until 2015. Bono has also said he believes this to be the best song on How to Dismantle an Atomic Bomb.  In concerts in December 2005, Bono has said the song is one of many influenced by John Lennon's music. The music video for the single utilised animated computer-generated imagery by Spontaneous, something unprecedented for U2 videos.

Live performances
In concert form during the Vertigo Tour, the song was played with the Edge on piano, often accompanied by Bono on acoustic guitar. On rare occasions, it was played with the Edge on electric guitar, in a performance which was accompanied by a pianist and full orchestra, much similar to the performance of the album, and one of those performances was at their show in Milan, Italy in July 2005, which appeared on the Vertigo 05: Live from Milan bonus DVD for U2's 2006 compilation U218 Singles.

Reception
The song was added to the playlists of thirteen alternative rock radio stations in the US.  However, it failed to break the top 40, thus not charting on the Modern Rock Tracks chart.  Instead it hovered around #60, rising to #55 in mid-January.  However, it never gained enough airplay to enter the chart.  It was slated for a UK release and was playlisted by Xfm London, Virgin Radio, and made the B-List of BBC Radio 2.

Track listing
The U.S. promo was released in late 2005, while the U.K. promo was released in early 2006.

Chart

Release history

References

External links
 

U2 songs
2004 songs
Rock ballads
Song recordings produced by Jacknife Lee
Songs written by Bono
Songs written by the Edge
Songs written by Adam Clayton
Songs written by Larry Mullen Jr.
Song recordings produced by Steve Lillywhite